César Ramírez and Miguel Ángel Reyes-Varela were the defending champion. This year, Ramírez partnered Adrián Menéndez-Maceiras, but they lost to Kevin King and Dean O'Brien in the quarterfinals. Reyes-Varela played with Marcelo Demoliner.

Austin Krajicek and Rajeev Ram won the title, defeating Demoliner and Reyes-Varela in the final, 7–5, 4–6, [10–6].

Seeds

Draw

References
 Main Draw

Jalisco Open - Doubles